Karolina Kowalkiewicz (born 15 October 1985) is a Polish mixed martial artist.  She currently fights for the Ultimate Fighting Championship (UFC). She is the former KSW Women's Flyweight Champion.

Mixed martial arts career

Early career
Kowalkiewicz began her mixed martial arts career at the age of sixteen when she began training in Krav Maga.  She later trained in Muay Thai and decided to make it a career.  She fought two amateur fights before turning pro.

Kowalkiewicz made her professional debut in her native Poland in May 2012.  Over the next three-and-a-half years she amassed an undefeated record of seven wins against no losses.  She fought primarily for the Poland-based KSW promotion - where she was the Flyweight champion - and also made her U.S. debut for Invicta FC in November 2014.

Ultimate Fighting Championship
In late October 2015, it was announced that Kowalkiewicz had signed with the UFC.  She faced Randa Markos on December 19, 2015 at UFC on FOX 17.  She was successful in her debut, winning the fight by unanimous decision.

Kowalkiewicz next faced Heather Jo Clark on May 8, 2016 at UFC Fight Night 87 in Rotterdam, Netherlands. She won the fight via unanimous decision.

Kowalkiewicz defeated Rose Namajunas by split decision on July 30, 2016 at UFC 201 to earn the next title shot at then-champion Joanna Jędrzejczyk. This performance earned her a Fight of the Night bonus

Kowalkiewicz fought for the Strawweight title and lost to champion Joanna Jędrzejczyk by unanimous decision on November 12, 2016 at UFC 205.

Kowalkiewicz faced Cláudia Gadelha on June 3, 2017 in the co-main event at UFC 212. She lost the fight via submission due to a rear-naked choke in the first round.

Kowalkiewicz faced Jodie Esquibel on October 21, 2017 at UFC Fight Night: Cerrone vs. Till. She won the fight by unanimous decision.

Kowalkiewicz faced Felice Herrig on April 7, 2018 at UFC 223. She won the fight by split decision.

Kowalkiewicz fought Jéssica Andrade on September 8, 2018 at UFC 228. She lost the fight by knockout in the first round.

Kowalkiewicz faced Michelle Waterson at UFC on ESPN 2 on March 30, 2019. She lost the fight via unanimous decision.

Kowalkiewicz faced Alexa Grasso on June 8, 2019 at UFC 238. She lost the fight via unanimous decision.

Kowalkiewicz faced Yan Xiaonan on February 23, 2020 at UFC Fight Night 168. She lost the fight by unanimous decision.

Kowalkiewicz faced Jessica Penne on August 7, 2021 at UFC 265. She lost the fight via an armbar in round one.

After a one-year hiatus, Kowalkiewicz faced Felice Herrig on June 4, 2022, at UFC Fight Night 207. Kowalkiewicz snapped a 5 bout losing streak, submitting Herrig via rear-naked choke in the second round.

Kowalkiewicz faced Silvana Gómez Juárez on November 12, 2022, at UFC 281. She won the fight via unanimous decision.

Kowalkiewicz is scheduled to face  Vanessa Demopoulos on May 13, 2023 at UFC Fight Night 225.

Championships and accomplishments

Mixed martial arts
Ultimate Fighting Championship
 Fight of the Night (One time)
Invicta Fighting Championships
 Fight of the Night (One time)
Konfrontacja Sztuk Walki
KSW Flyweight Championship (One title defense)
Fight of the Night (One time)

Personal life
In 2019, Kowalkiewicz was diagnosed with Hashimoto's disease. To cope with the symptoms Kowalkiewicz now works with an endocrinologist and has adopted a vegan diet.

Mixed martial arts record

|-
|Win
|align=center|14–7
|Silvana Gómez Juárez
|Decision (unanimous)
|UFC 281
|
|align=center|3
|align=center|5:00
|New York City, New York, United States
|
|-
|Win
|align=center|13–7
|Felice Herrig
|Submission (rear-naked choke)
|UFC Fight Night: Volkov vs. Rozenstruik
|
|align=center|2
|align=center|4:01
|Las Vegas, Nevada, United States
|
|-
|Loss
|align=center|12–7
|Jessica Penne
|Submission (armbar)
|UFC 265
|
|align=center|1
|align=center|4:32
|Houston, Texas, United States
|
|-
|Loss
|align=center|12–6
|Yan Xiaonan
|Decision (unanimous)
|UFC Fight Night: Felder vs. Hooker 
|
|align=center|3
|align=center|5:00
|Auckland, New Zealand
|
|-
|Loss
|align=center|12–5
|Alexa Grasso
|Decision (unanimous)
|UFC 238 
|
|align=center|3
|align=center|5:00
|Chicago, Illinois, United States
|
|-
|Loss
|align=center|12–4
|Michelle Waterson
|Decision (unanimous)
|UFC on ESPN: Barboza vs. Gaethje 
|
|align=center|3
|align=center|5:00
|Philadelphia, Pennsylvania, United States
|
|- 
|Loss
|align=center|12–3
|Jéssica Andrade
|KO (punch)
|UFC 228
|
|align=center|1
|align=center|1:58
|Dallas, Texas, United States
|
|-
|Win
|align=center|12–2
|Felice Herrig
|Decision (split)
|UFC 223
|
|align=center|3
|align=center|5:00
|Brooklyn, New York, United States
|
|-
|Win
|align=center|11–2
|Jodie Esquibel
|Decision (unanimous)
|UFC Fight Night: Cowboy vs. Till
|
|align=center|3
|align=center|5:00
|Gdańsk, Poland
|
|-
|Loss
|align=center|10–2
|Cláudia Gadelha
|Submission (rear-naked choke)
|UFC 212
|
|align=center|1
|align=center|3:03
|Rio de Janeiro, Brazil
|
|-
|Loss
|align=center|10–1
|Joanna Jędrzejczyk
|Decision (unanimous)
|UFC 205 
|
|align=center|5
|align=center|5:00
|New York City, New York, United States
|
|-
|Win
|align=center|10–0
|Rose Namajunas
|Decision (split)
|UFC 201 
|
|align=center|3
|align=center|5:00
|Atlanta, Georgia, United States
|
|-
|Win
|align=center|9–0
|Heather Jo Clark
|Decision (unanimous)
|UFC Fight Night: Overeem vs. Arlovski
|
|align=center|3
|align=center|5:00
|Rotterdam, Netherlands
|
|-
|Win
|align=center|8–0
|Randa Markos
|Decision (unanimous)
|UFC on Fox: dos Anjos vs. Cowboy 2
|
|align=center|3
|align=center|5:00
|Orlando, Florida, United States
|
|-
| Win
| align=center | 7–0
| Kalindra Faria
| Decision (split)
| KSW 30
| 
| align=center | 3
| align=center | 5:00
| Poznań, Poland
| 
|- 
| Win
| align=center | 6–0
| Mizuki Inoue
| Decision (split)
| Invicta FC 9: Honchak vs. Hashi
| 
| align=center | 3
| align=center | 5:00
| Davenport, Iowa, United States
|
|-
| Win
| align=center | 5–0
| Jasminka Cive
| Submission (armbar)
| KSW 27
| 
| align=center | 1
| align=center | 3:53
| Gdańsk, Poland
| 
|-
| Win
| align=center | 4–0
| Simona Soukupova
| Decision (unanimous)
| KSW 24
| 
| align=center | 3
| align=center | 5:00
| Łódź, Poland
|
|-
| Win
| align=center | 3–0
| Marta Chojnoska
| Submission (rear-naked choke)
| KSW 23
| 
| align=center | 1
| align=center | 1:11
| Gdańsk, Poland
| 
|-
| Win
| align=center | 2–0
| Paulina Bońkowska
| Decision (unanimous)
| KSW 21
| 
| align=center | 3
| align=center | 5:00
| Warsaw, Poland
|
|-
| Win
| align=center | 1–0
| Marzena Wojas
| TKO (punches)
| Extreme Fighting Sports 2
| 
| align=center | 1
| align=center | 3:12
| Gdynia, Poland
|
|-

Amateur mixed martial arts record

|-
| Loss
|align=center| 0–1
| Joanna Jędrzejczyk
| Submission (rear-naked choke)
| Amatorska Liga MMA 18
| 
|align=center| 1
|align=center| 4:18
| Sochaczew, Poland
| 
|-

References

External links

 

1985 births
Living people
Sportspeople from Łódź
Polish female mixed martial artists
Strawweight mixed martial artists
Flyweight mixed martial artists
Mixed martial artists utilizing Muay Thai
Mixed martial artists utilizing Krav Maga
Ultimate Fighting Championship female fighters
Polish Muay Thai practitioners
Female Muay Thai practitioners